Alphestes is a genus of marine ray-finned fish, groupers from the subfamily Epinephelinae in the family Serranidae, which also includes the anthias and the sea basses. Alphestes species are found in the western Atlantic Ocean and the eastern Pacific Ocean.

Species 
There are three species in the genus: 

Alphestes afer Mutton hamlet (Bloch, 1793)
Alphestes immaculatus Pacific mutton hamlet Breder, 1936
Alphestes multiguttatus Rivulated mutton hamlet (Günther, 1867)

References

Epinephelini